Mark Slater (born 11 July 1951) is a former Australian rules footballer who played with Collingwood in the Victorian Football League (VFL).

Aged just 17, Slater made his VFL debut in Collingwood's round 10 win over Geelong at Victoria Park in the 1969 season. His second and final appearance for Collingwood came in the opening round of the 1970 VFL season, against Footscray at Western Oval.

Slater captain-coached Bundoora to the 1981 Diamond Valley Football League Division 2 premiership. He won the Division 2's best and fairest award that year.

References

1951 births
Australian rules footballers from Victoria (Australia)
Collingwood Football Club players
Bundoora Football Club players
Living people